Governor Baldwin may refer to:

Henry P. Baldwin (1814–1892), 15th Governor of Michigan
Oliver Baldwin, 2nd Earl Baldwin of Bewdley (1899–1958), Governor of the Leeward Islands from 1948 to 1950
Raymond E. Baldwin (1893–1986), 72nd and 74th Governor of Connecticut
Roger Sherman Baldwin (1793–1863), 32nd Governor of Connecticut
Simeon Eben Baldwin (1840–1927), 65th Governor of Connecticut